David Tai Bornoff (born 1980 in Chicago, Illinois) is an American writer, Advertising Creative Director, photographer, film director and multimedia artist.

His work has been exhibited internationally and his writing featured in many fashion and music related magazines. His commercial editing work is extensive, including the first GMC commercial to ever air on the super bowl. He is responsible for editing the pop culture hit "ShamWow" directed by pitchman Vince Offer.

Life and work

Early years
David Tai Bornoff was born in 1980, the son of Denise Kaprelian and Jack Bornoff, both graduates of the School of the Art Institute of Chicago and early pioneers of the Chicago performance art movement. At the age of 5 the family moved to Los Angeles where from an early age his peers and mentors were skateboarders, graffiti writers, musicians, and artists that were considered to be on the fringes of society. David accepted an offer to complete high school at the Los Angeles County High School for the Arts where he took early classes in Computer graphics and became the youngest Graphics editor of the Association for Computing Machinery.
David Tai Bornoff holds an undergraduate degree in Fine Arts from Otis College of Art and Design in Los Angeles, and a Post Diplome in Multimedia from The École nationale supérieure des Beaux-Arts in Paris.

Career

Advertising
David has won multiple Gold ADDY Awards for editing, directing, and his creative strategies. David is a board member of The Joint Photographic Experts Group (Jpeg), The Moving Picture Experts Group, and is an advisor to the Sacramento Film Commission.

Art
 2001 "Egofugal - Fugue from Ego for the Next Emergence" - Istanbul Biennial, with Seza Paker, curated by Yuko Hasegawa

Writing
 Frank151 - Multiple Issues
 Featured in Modern Painter Magazine
 Featured in Nylon Magazine
 Featured on Gawker
 "The New Dark Ages" by Justin Blyth
 "One Thousand Years This Was a Glacier" (to be published in 2012 by Reserve)

Music
Bornoff formed The Mongrels in late 2009 with musicians Static Shock (producer of Shunda K) and actor Steven Heath. Their website claims they have broken up but the band still plays shows in Los Angeles.

References

 Frank151, Bar & Grill - Words and photos: David Tai Bornoff
 http://www.siggraph.org/artdesign/gallery/S03/artists.html
 https://archive.today/20121211113046/https://intranet.otis.edu/alumni/notes/2006-02.htm
 https://www.imdb.com/name/nm1781181/
 http://216.178.38.204/index.cfm?fuseaction=vids.individual&VideoID=27486253

http://creativity-online.com/index.php?action=search:credit_detail&credit_name=David+Bornoff

American photographers
1980 births
Living people
Writers from Chicago
Los Angeles County High School for the Arts alumni
Film directors from Los Angeles